Chijioke Ejiogu  (born 22 November 1984 in Imo State) is a Nigerian football goalkeeper, he plays for Heartland FC.

Career
He began his career at Arugo F.C.(where he earned the nickname "Arugo Monkey"),he then played for Dolphins F.C. and Julius Berger FC. He was held in high regard by Dolphins F.C, with some considering him a hero. The players alongside Victor Babayaro (Director of Sport by Dolphins F.C) allegedly collected money meant to be part payment of sign on fees as well as three months salary from Akwa United F.C. and then returned to Dolphins F.C. In August 2008, he briefly signed up for Heartland F.C. and later left the team and moved to Enyimba in September that year.He also played for Sharks F.C. and Ifeanyi Ubah FC. In 2018 he signed for Heartland.

He is renowned for his ability to stop penalty kicks, most memorably at the 2007 Nigerian FA Cup Final between Dolphins FC and Enugu Rangers where he stopped 4 penalty kicks at the penalty shoot-outs, also during Enyimba's CAF Confederation Cup penalty shoot-out in 2010 against DR Congo's AS Vita where he stopped three penalty kicks.

He is a highly decorated player in the Nigerian Professional Football League, winning the NPFL title once with Dolphins FC (2004) and twice with Enyimba (2010 & 2015).

He is also the most decorated player in the Nigerian FA Cup with
seven winners' medals, he won the Cup with Julius Berger in 2002,Dolphins in 2004, 2006 & 2007,Enyimba in 2009, 2014 and Heartland in 2012.

He was part of the Julius Berger side that played in the final of the now defunct CAF Cup Winners' Cup in 2003 and was also part of the Dolphins team that played in the final of the CAF Confederation Cup in 2005.

Honours

Club
Julius Berger
Nigerian FA Cup: 2002
Nigerian Super Cup: 2002
CAF Cup Winners' Cup: 2003, Runner-up

Dolphins
Nigerian Professional Football League: 2004
Nigerian FA Cup: 2004, 2006, 2007
CAF Confederation Cup: 2005, Runner-up

Enyimba
Nigerian Professional Football League: 2009–10, 2015
Nigerian FA Cup: 2009, 2014
Nigerian Super Cup: 2010

Ifeanyi Ubah
NEROS Anambra FA Cup: 2017

Heartland
Nigerian FA Cup: 2012

External links

References

1984 births
Living people
Nigerian footballers
Nigeria international footballers
Enyimba F.C. players
Heartland F.C. players
Dolphin F.C. (Nigeria) players
Akwa United F.C. players
Bridge F.C. players
Sportspeople from Imo State
Association football goalkeepers